Literaturpreis der Stadt München is a Bavarian literary prize. The prize money is €10,000.

Winners 

1928 Hans Carossa
1929 Willy Seidel
1930 Hans Brandenburg
1931 Josef Magnus Wehner
1932 Ruth Schaumann
1933 Hans Zöberlein
1935 Georg Britting
1936 Ludwig Friedrich Barthel
1937 Alfons von Czibulka
1938 Josef Ponten
1945 Peter Dörfler
1947 Gertrud von le Fort
1948 Ernst Penzoldt
1949 Georg Schwarz
1950 Annette Kolb
1951 Gottfried Kölwel
1952 Eugen Roth
1953 Mechtilde Lichnowsky
1954 Wilhelm Hausenstein
1955 Erich Kästner
1957 Lion Feuchtwanger
1958 Reiner Zimnik
1962 Herbert Schneider
1963 Hellmut von Cube
1964 Tankred Dorst
1973 Philipp Arp
1975 Janosch
1980 Mathias Schröder
1986 Said
1989 Uwe Timm
1990 Gert Heidenreich
1991 Carl Amery
1993 Gert Hofmann
1995 Hermann Lenz
1997 Günter Herburger
1999 Ernst Augustin
2002 Uwe Timm
2005 Herbert Rosendorfer
2008 Tilman Spengler
2011 Keto von Waberer
2014 Hans Pleschinski
2017 Mirjam Pressler
2020 Christine Wunnicke

References

External links
 

Literary awards of Bavaria